The 7 cm Gebirgsgeschütz M 99 was a mountain gun used by Austria-Hungary during World War I. It was obsolete upon introduction as it had a bronze barrel, a spring-loaded spade to absorb the recoil forces and it had to be relaid after every shot. The high elevations required of mountain guns greatly complicated the provision of barrel recoil systems as the breech could recoil into the ground, and it would be some years before satisfactory systems were developed. These would result in the 7 cm Gebirgsgeschütz M 8 and M 9 that used the same barrel and ammunition as the M 99, but had Gun shields and more advanced recoil systems.

The Gebirgsgeschütz M 99 broke down into three loads for transport.

References 
 Ortner, M. Christian. Austro-Hungarian Artillery From 1867 to 1918: Technology, Organization, and Tactics. Vienna, Verlag Militaria, 2007

External links 

 Gebirgsgeschütz M 99 on Landships

World War I mountain artillery
70 mm artillery
World War I artillery of Austria-Hungary